Bezedek is a village in Baranya county, Hungary. Until the end of World War II, the Inhabitants was Danube Swabians. Mostly of the former German Settlers was expelled to Germany and Austria in 1945–1948, about the Potsdam Agreement.
Only a few Germans of Hungary live there, the majority today are the descendants of Hungarians from the Czechoslovak–Hungarian population exchange. They got the houses of the former Danube Swabians Inhabitants.

References

External links 
 [ Street map] 

Populated places in Baranya County